Vanderkaay is a surname. Notable people with the surname include:

Peter Vanderkaay (born 1984), American swimmer 
Alex Vanderkaay (born 1986), American swimmer